Villa Aeroparque is a small town or urban fragment (fraccionamiento) in the Canelones Department of southern Uruguay.

Geography

Location
It is part of the wider metropolitan area of Montevideo.

Population
In 2011 Villa Aeroparque had a population of 4,307.
 
Source: Instituto Nacional de Estadística de Uruguay

References

External links
INE map of Villa Aeroparque, Villa El Tato, Lomas de Carrasco, Carmel and Altos de la Tahona

Populated places in the Canelones Department